Mordellistena michalki is a species of beetle in the genus Mordellistena of the family Mordellidae. It was described by Ermisch in 1956, and can be found in such countries as Austria, Bosnia and Herzegovina, Czech Republic, Germany, Slovakia and Republic of Macedonia.

References

Beetles described in 1956
michalki
Beetles of Europe